Chatburn is a civil parish in Ribble Valley, Lancashire, England.  It contains six listed buildings that are recorded in the National Heritage List for England.  Of these, one is at Grade II*, the middle grade, and the others are at Grade II, the lowest grade.  The parish contains the village of Chatburn and surrounding countryside.  The listed buildings consist of houses, farmhouses, and a church.

Key

Buildings

References

Citations

Sources

Lists of listed buildings in Lancashire
Buildings and structures in Ribble Valley